This list of episodes of Conan details information on the 2019 episodes of Conan, a television program on TBS hosted by Conan O'Brien.

2019

January

February

March

April

May

June

July

August

September

October

November

December

Notes
Kumail Nanjiani was originally scheduled as the guest for the July 11 episode to promote the film Stuber but had to cancel at the last minute due to scheduling conflicts with production on Silicon Valley. O'Brien's assistant Sona Movsesian was interviewed in his place.

References

Episodes (2019)
Lists of variety television series episodes
2019-related lists